HMS Goodson (K480), originally USS George (DE-276), was an Evarts class destroyer escort, assigned to the United Kingdom under the lend-lease.

The ship was laid down as George on 20 May 1943 at the Boston Navy Yard, and named after Eugene Frank George, posthumously awarded the Navy Cross at Guadalcanal.

She was assigned to the United Kingdom under the lend-lease on 22 June 1943; launched on 8 July 1943; transferred to the United Kingdom on 9 October 1943; and commissioned in the British Royal Navy as HMS Goodson.

During the remainder of World War II, she served on escort and patrol duty in the Atlantic and along the English coast.  She supported the Allied Invasion of Europe at Normandy on 6 June 1944.  Damaged 25 June by U-984 commanded by Heinz Sieder, she was returned to the United States Navy on 21 October. On 9 January 1947 she was sold to John Lee of Belfast, Northern Ireland.

A subsequent vessel named  was launched 14 August 1943 at the Defoe Shipbuilding Company, Bay City, Michigan.

References

Evarts-class destroyer escorts
Captain-class frigates
World War II frigates of the United Kingdom
Ships built in Boston
1943 ships
Maritime incidents in June 1944